Center Street Historic District may refer to:

Center Street Historic District (Birmingham, Alabama), listed on the National Register of Historic Places (NRHP) in Birmingham, Alabama
Center Street Historic District (Ashland, Ohio), NRHP-listed

See also
South Center Street Historic District, Arlington, Texas, NRHP-listed in Tarrant County
Logan Center Street Historic District, Logan, Utah, NRHP-listed in Cache County